The House of Smecchia is the name of an old aristocratic family of Serbian origin from Perast that rose to power during the Republic of Venice. The vernacular is Smeća or Smekja.

History
The earliest mention of the Smecchia family living in Boka Kotorska was found in a written document from 1326. The area flourished during the 14th century under the rule of Dušan the Mighty, Emperor of the Serbs who, notorious for his aggressive law enforcement, made the Bay of Kotor a particularly safe and prosperous place for doing business.

Centuries later, when the Kotor Bay was part of the Republic of Venice, Vincenzo Vicko Smekja (1694-1762) brought about the economic prosperity of the family, following his famous merchant undertaking when he established a trading route between Venice, Genoa and Mediterranean Sea in his ship “Leon Koronato” in 1746.  In 1748, Vicko and his brother Kristofor Krsto were awarded with the title of “Konte” (Count) by Pietro Grimani, who was at that time Doge of Venice. The title was hereditary by all their legitimate male line descendants. Vicko's son, Konte Petar (1724-1767) established a trading route between Venice the Baltic countries. The family also acquired the status of Kotor nobility in 1779.

A branch of the Smecchia family was notable in Perast, Boka Kotorska, Venetian Republic (today Montenegro). The Smekja palace is the biggest of all palaces in Perast. The three-story edifice with belvedere was entirely built of stone brought from the island of Korčula.  A terraced porch stretches along the whole length of the first floor, while the second and third floors are decorated with balustraded balconies.  Above the entrance is the coat-of-arms of the casada Cizmaj – two crossed branches with five feathers on each one.

The important Perast manuscript was discovered in the palace in Perast. The palace was sold in 1923 by Count Franz-Emil de Smecchia (1861-1924) and his brother Count Attilio de Smecchia (1864-1943), who were at that time living in Zagreb. Attilio's granddaughter, Countess Lilia de Smecchia (b. 1947) is the mother of Princess Elisabetta of Belgium.

Properties

See also 
 Tripo Smeća

References 

Italian-language surnames